Claremorris GAA is a Gaelic Athletic Association Club based in the town of Claremorris in County Mayo, Ireland. The club was founded in 1884 and is a member of the South division of Mayo GAA. The club represents and draws players from the town of Claremorris and half parish of Barnacarroll to the north.

The club currently competes at Senior level and has won the Mayo Senior Football Championship 4 times in the 1960s and 70s. The club previously had a hurling team which won 2 Mayo Senior Hurling Championship titles in 1968 and 1971 and has a competitive Ladies football team.

Notable players
 Henry Dixon
 Austin Garvin

Honours
Mayo Senior Football Championships: 4
1961, 1964, 1965, 1971
Connacht Senior Club Football Championship: 1
1972
Mayo Senior Hurling Championships: 2
1968, 1971

References

Gaelic football clubs in County Mayo
Hurling clubs in County Mayo
Gaelic games clubs in County Mayo